Cao Văn Triền (born 18 June 1993) is a Vietnamese footballer who plays as a midfielder for Topeland Bình Định.

Career

Cao started his career with Vietnamese second division side Khánh Hòa, helping them achieve promotion to the Vietnamese top flight.

Before the 2017 season, he signed for Sài Gòn in the Vietnamese top flight.

In 2021, Cao will sign for Japanese club FC Ryukyu.

References

External links
 
 Cao Văn Triền at SAIGON FC

People from Bình Định province
Vietnamese footballers
V.League 1 players
Living people
Association football midfielders
1993 births